This is a list of mayors of Montreux, Vaud, Switzerland. The mayor (syndic) of Montreux chairs the seven-member municipal council (Municipalité). 

Montreux was formed in 1962, through the merger of the municipalities of Montreux-Châtelard ("Le Châtelard") and Montreux-Planches ("Les Planches").

For earlier mayors, see:
List of mayors of Le Châtelard, Vaud
List of mayors of Les Planches

References 

Montreux
Montreux
 
Lists of mayors (complete 1900-2013)